Soldatskoe Valley Cross Country Skiing and Biathlon Stadium, also known as "Alatau" Cross Country Skiing and Biathlon Stadium  (Alataý shańǵy jáne bıatlon stadıondarynyń kesheni) is a cross-country skiing and biathlon venue located at the Soldatskoye Valley in the Talgar District of Almaty Region, Kazakhstan.

Characteristics 
The venue was built for the 2011 Asian Winter Games and is homologated by International Ski Federation

The stadium buildings are located in the center of the complex, and the tracks are located taking into account the possibility of simultaneous competitions in both stadiums in different disciplines. In May 2021, the public organization "Alma-Qala'21" planted 50 trees on the territory of the complex.

The complex consists of two independent stadiums connected by a hotel and a service complex. The capacity of each stadium is 3,100 people, of which 1,800 seats and 1,300 standing seats.

The maximum length of the ski slopes is 10 km, which consists of two independent circles 5 km (red) + 5 km (blue). The maximum length of the biathlon trails is 4 km. The total length of the trails is 14 km.

Competitions 
The ski and biathlon complex regularly hosts biathlon and cross-country skiing competitions at the national level, such as championships and cups of Kazakhstan.

The complex also hosted a number of international competitions:

 2011 - VII Asian Winter Games
 biathlon
 ski racing
 ski orienteering

 2014 - Asian Biathlon Championship
 2017 - 28th Winter Universiade
 biathlon
 ski racing
 Nordic combined (competitions were also held at the ski jumping complex)

References

Sports venues in Kazakhstan
Buildings and structures in Almaty Region
Ski stadiums in Kazakhstan
Skiing in Kazakhstan